Earl Carl "Whitey" Adolfson Jr. (November 11, 1931 – November 10, 2014) was an American football and wrestling coach. He served as the head football coach at Glenville State College in Glenville, West Virginia from 1975 to 1979.

References

1931 births
2014 deaths
American football centers
American football linebackers
American wrestling coaches
Glenville State Pioneers football coaches
West Virginia Mountaineers football players
West Virginia Tech Golden Bears football players
College wrestling coaches in the United States
People from Pleasants County, West Virginia
Players of American football from West Virginia